Play That Rock N' Roll is a studio album by American rock and roll band Supersuckers. It was released on February 7, 2020, by Acetate Records on CD and colored vinyl.

Track listing
 "Ain't Gonna Stop (Until I Stop It)"
 "Getting Into Each Other's Pants"
 "Deceptive Expectation"
 "You Ain't the Boss of Me"
 "Bringing It Back"
 "Play That Rock-N-Roll"
 "That's a Thing"
 "Last Time Again"
 "Die Alone"
 "Dead, Jail or Rock-N-Roll"
 "Untitled"

References

Supersuckers albums
2020 albums